Crna River ( / Црна ријека, "Black River") is left tributary of Vrbas. It arises from Malo Lake (Malo jezero, "Little Lake", 780 m) of Balkana, Mrkonjić Grad Municipality. The lake fed by streams Cjepalo (1320 m) and Skakavac with mountain Lisina, as well as sublacustric  sources under the Veliko Lake (Veliko jezero, "Great Lake").

The river flows in the direction south-north and on the way runs through the town, and after a flow of 17 km flows into the Vrbas (at places Dabrac). It used to be known for numerous fish species and developed the sport fishing.

References

Rivers of Bosnia and Herzegovina
Mrkonjić Grad